This is a list of Fulbright Scholars from the University of Belgrade's Law School.
Oliver Antić, University of Michigan, 1968/1969
Sima Avramović, University of Maryland, 1983/1984
Vesna Besarević, University of South Carolina, 1988/1989
Vlajko Brajić, Western Michigan University, 1969/1970
Vojin Dimitrijević, University of Virginia, 1984/1985
Jovan Djordjević, Claremont Graduate School, 1980/1981
Miroljub Labus, Cornell University, 1983/1984
Stevan Lilić, University of Minnesota, 1985/1986
Stevan Lilić, University of Pittsburgh, 2001/2002
Ivan Maksimović, University at Albany, SUNY, 1980/1981 
Zoran Milovanović, The George Washington University, 1980/1981
Miroslav Petrović, Western Michigan University and University of California, 1971/1972
Dejan Popović, University of Maryland, 1984/1985
Zagorka Simić, New York University, 1970/1971
Radoslav Stojanović, University of North Carolina, 1980/1981
Radoslav Stojanović, University of North Carolina, 1985/1986

Junior Faculty Development Program (JFDP Scholars):
Balsa Kašćelan, University of Pittsburgh,  2004/2005
Nenad Tešić, Brooklyn Law School, 2004/2005
Sanja Gligić, University of Pittsburgh, 2004/2005

Ron Brown Scholars:
Svetislava Bulajić, University of Connecticut, 1997/1998
Marija Karanikić, Duke University, 2001/2002

Sources
The Fulbright Alumni Association of Serbia

University of Belgrade Faculty of Law
Belgrade
Fulbright